Charles Arthur Everett (March 24, 1828 – May 16, 1909) was a merchant and political figure in New Brunswick, Canada. He represented City and County of St. John in the House of Commons of Canada from 1885 to 1887 as a Conservative member.

Everett was an unsuccessful candidate for a federal seat in 1882. He was defeated in a bid for reelection in 1887.

References 
 

1828 births
1909 deaths
Members of the House of Commons of Canada from New Brunswick
Conservative Party of Canada (1867–1942) MPs